The National Union of Blastfurnacemen, Ore Miners, Coke Workers and Kindred Trades (NUB) was a trade union in England and Wales which existed between 1888 and 1985. It represented process workers in the British iron and steel industry.

History

Prior to the formation of the union, blastfurnacemen had been represented by the Associated Iron and Steel Workers of Great Britain, but this organisation concerned itself primarily with the puddlers.  In response, the Cleveland-based blastfurnacemen split away to form the "Cleveland Blastfurnacemen's Association" in 1878, followed in 1887 by a split in Cumberland.  These two unions merged the following year to form the first National Association of Blastfurnacemen, which rapidly spread across the country.

The union was re-founded in 1892 in Workington as the National Federation of Blastfurnacemen, with membership reaching 6,773 in 1898, then continuing a slow growth.  In 1904, the organisation of the union devoted itself to organising in Cleveland and South Durham, while a new national federation of the same name was founded the following year, and the old union affiliated to it.  In 1909, it was renamed as the National Federation of Blastfurnacemen, Ore Miners and Kindred Trades, and membership topped 25,000 by 1918.  In 1921, the members of the federation united to form a single union, the "National Union of Blastfurnacemen, Ore Miners, Coke Workers and Kindred Trades".

The union suffered a lengthy decline in membership, exacerbated by the closure of many foundries.  By 1980, membership had fallen to less than 14,000, and it developed a close working relationship with the Iron and Steel Trades Confederation (ISTC), which already organised blast furnace workers in Scotland.  In 1985, the NUB merged into the ISTC.

Election results
The union sponsored a Labour Party candidate in several Parliamentary elections.

Leadership

General Secretaries
1889: William Snow
1892: Patrick Walls
1917: Thomas McKenna
1939: Ambrose Callighan
1948: Jack Owen
1953: Joseph O'Hagan
1968: James Barry
1970: Hector Smith
1982: Nick Leadley

General Presidents
1921: Henry Nixon
1939: Ambrose Callighan
1939: Harry France
1948: Joseph O'Hagan
1953–1959: Thomas Walsh

References

External links
Catalogue of the NUB archives, held at the Modern Records Centre, University of Warwick

Defunct trade unions of the United Kingdom
1888 establishments in the United Kingdom
Steel industry trade unions of the United Kingdom
Mining trade unions
Mining in the United Kingdom
Trade unions established in 1888
Trade unions disestablished in 1985
Iron and Steel Trades Confederation amalgamations
Trade unions based in North Yorkshire